In Search Of is a 2008 drama film written and directed by James C. Zelker and produced by the company Independent Dream Machine.

Synopsis 
In Search Of is an unconventional drama where a wrong decision will force good people into bad circumstances while desire changes everything. The film follows ten characters that use sex as a way to get something out of life. Dave (played by Jack Barley) starts a business only so that he can afford the lifestyle that his girlfriend is accustomed to. Lauren is cheating on her husband with her soul mate, while Lauren's son Jack (Michael Rady) uses his wealth to manipulate those who love him. Andy (played by Keith Nobbs), is a high school football player who falls prey to peer pressure from teammates which forces him to deal with his own sexual desires.

Cast 

Michael Rady as Jack
Keith Nobbs as  Andy
Jack Barley as Dave
Dan Lauria as Reverend Blackwell
Casey Biggs as Tim
Alex Colvin as Kevin
Ryan McDonald as Red
Barry Glassman as Fertility Doctor

additional cast
Laura L. Cottrel as Beth Ann
Emily Grace as Mindy
Gilbert Cruz as Luis
David Siik as Steve
Leah Schmidt as Jeni
Joshua Burrow as Jay
Nick Skawski as kicker
Derek Garman as Quarterback
Seth Tarboro as Football Player
Yadira Maldonado as Katy
Rachael Kemery as Shea
Tracy Toth as Lauren
Hodge Lucas Todd as Legacy

Production 

Shot in Allentown, Pennsylvania, and the Lehigh Valley over the course of a year on 35mm and S16mm film, the production used various cameras including a Krasnogorsk hand-cranked camera, achieving all optical effects during production.

In Search Of was the first film to play in another reality when it screened in Second Life in 2008.

Release
The film screened nationally and in London at "Power to the Pixel" during the London Film Festival as one of the two winners of the From Here to Awesome Film Festival.  Its theatrical premiere was held in Allentown, Pennsylvania on November 7, 2008 and grossed $12,608 at that screening and went on to earn a modest six figure sum.  The film is currently distributed across various platforms, on Hulu it was in the top 20 dramas viewed all time for over seven years.

References

External links 

 
 Official site
 FHTA FILMS LONDON BOUND
 Production Report
 Independent Dream Machine
 Premiere
 From Here to Awesome: "InSearchOf"
 Filmmaker Zeke Zelker talks about his new movie, "InSearchOf"
  "Pajamas," "InSearchOf" Lead Chart
 From Here to Awesome: "IN SEARCH OF"
 From Here To Awesome Winners Screen in London
 TinyBeamofLight

2008 films
2008 drama films
American drama films
Films shot in Allentown, Pennsylvania
2000s English-language films
2000s American films